Passport is a 2012 Bengali film directed by Raj Mukherjee. The film's music was composed by Subhayu Bedajna.

Cast
 Ferdous Ahmed
 Gargi Raychowdhury
 Pratik Sen
 Pamela
 Ritu Sarkhel
 Joy Badlani
 Mainak Banerjee
 Rajesh Sharma

Soundtrack

References

External links
 Passport (2012 film) at the Gomolo

2012 films
Bengali-language Indian films
2010s Bengali-language films